The White Hart is a Grade II listed pub at Kings Walk, Grays, Essex, RM17 6HR.

It was built in 1938 for Charringtons Brewery, and replaced an 18th-century building of the same name. The architect is believed to be Edward Fincham. The bar is considered by some to be haunted.

It was Grade II listed in 2015 by Historic England.

Golliwog controversy 
In February 2018 an investigation into the pub was held by Thurrock Council after a complaint was made against the display of golliwog dolls around the pub. The pub's owners refused to remove the dolls, citing support from its customers to keep them on display.

References

Grade II listed pubs in Essex
Grays, Essex
Pubs in Essex